Hypersalivation, or ptyalism, also known as sialorrhea or hypersialosis is the excessive production of saliva.  It has also been defined as increased amount of saliva in the mouth, which may also be caused by decreased clearance of saliva.

Hypersalivation can contribute to drooling if there is an inability to keep the mouth closed or difficulty in swallowing (dysphagia) the excess saliva, which can lead to excessive spitting.

Hypersalivation also often precedes emesis (vomiting), where it accompanies nausea (a feeling of needing to vomit).

Causes

Excessive production
Conditions that can cause saliva overproduction include:
Rabies
Pellagra (niacin or Vitamin B3 deficiency)
Gastroesophageal reflux disease, in such cases specifically called a water brash (a loosely defined lay term), and is characterized by a sour fluid or almost tasteless saliva in the mouth
Gastroparesis (main symptoms are nausea, vomiting, and reflux)
Pregnancy
Fluoride therapy
Excessive starch intake
Anxiety (common sign of separation anxiety in dogs)
Pancreatitis
Liver disease
Serotonin syndrome
Mouth ulcers
Oral infections
Sjögren syndrome (an early symptom in some patients)
Medications that can cause overproduction of saliva include:
aripiprazole
clozapine
pilocarpine
ketamine
potassium chlorate
risperidone
pyridostigmine
Substances that can cause hypersalivation include:
mercury
copper
organophosphates (insecticide)
arsenic
nicotine
thallium

Decreased clearance
Causes of decreased clearance of saliva include:
Infections such as tonsillitis, retropharyngeal and peritonsillar abscesses, epiglottitis and mumps.
Problems with the jaw, e.g., fracture or dislocation
Radiation therapy
Neurologic disorders such as Amyotrophic lateral sclerosis, myasthenia gravis, Parkinson's disease, multiple system atrophy, rabies, bulbar paralysis, bilateral facial nerve palsy, and hypoglossal nerve palsy

Treatment
Hypersalivation is optimally treated by treating or avoiding the underlying cause. Mouthwash and tooth brushing may have drying effects.

In the palliative care setting, anticholinergics and similar drugs that would normally reduce the production of saliva causing a dry mouth could be considered for symptom management:  scopolamine, atropine, propantheline, hyoscine, amitriptyline, glycopyrrolate.

As of 2008, it is unclear if medication for people who have too much saliva due to clozapine treatment is useful.

References

External links 

Saliva
Salivary gland pathology